Konyshev is a Russian masculine surname, its feminine counterpart is Konysheva. Notable people with the surname include:

Dimitri Konyshev (born 1966), Russian road bicycle racer
Natta Konysheva (born 1935), Russian painter

Russian-language surnames